WNMQ (103.1 FM, "Q103-1") is a radio station  broadcasting a top 40 (CHR) format. Licensed to Columbus, Mississippi, United States, the station serves the Columbus-Starkville-West Point area. The station is currently owned by Cumulus Media.

History
The station was known as Star 103 with a contemporary hits format until April 2005 when it changed to Talk as "BC103". That format and branding lasted until September 2006 when a Hot AC format was launched as "103.1 The Spot." In late 2008, WMBC changed calls to WNMQ and became Top 40 "All the Hits Q103."

On August 16, 2010, WNMQ changed their format to sports, branded as "The Team". On January 2, 2013, WNMQ switched affiliations from ESPN Radio to CBS Sports Radio.

On July 31, 2017, WNMQ changed their format from Sports to Top 40 (CHR), branded as "Q103.1".

Former logo

References

External links

NMQ
Cumulus Media radio stations
Contemporary hit radio stations in the United States